The Terror of Rome Against the Son of Hercules is a 1964 peplum film directed by Mario Caiano and starring Mark Forest and Marilù Tolo.

Plot 
The hero Maciste suffers with the Christians the persecution from the Roman Empire. He, as a Spartan gladiator, falls in love with a young Christian and must save her from his condemnation in the arena. Maciste makes a desperate attempt to save the Christians. He will have to win monsters and gladiators to get the victory and stay with his beloved.

Cast 

 Mark Forest as Maciste 
 Marilù Tolo as  Olympia
  Elisabeth Fanty as Livia
 Robert Hundar as Zefatius 
 Giuseppe Addobbati as  Marcellus
  Franco Cobianchi as  Vitellius
 Ferruccio Amendola as  Dammatius
  Jacques Stany as  Epialtus

See also
 List of Italian films of 1964

Release
The Terror of Rome Against the Son of Hercules was released in Italy on March 26, 1964. It was released on home video by Something Weird Video.

References

Bibliography

External links

1960s adventure films
Peplum films
Films directed by Mario Caiano
Maciste films
Films set in the Roman Empire
Films about gladiatorial combat
Films set in the 1st century
Sword and sandal films
1960s Italian films